Bixler High Private Eye is an American comedy television film that aired on January 21, 2019. The film stars Jace Norman, Baby Ariel, Samiyah Womack and Ed Begley Jr. and was directed by Leslie Kolins Small.

Plot

Xander DeWitt (Jace Norman) is an inquisitive teenager with a knack for solving mysteries. His sleuthing skills get put to the test when his dad Russell (Rick Peters) leaves for work one day and vanishes without a trace. Frustrated by his attempts to find his dad – with the latest one getting him in trouble with the police – Xander’s mom Ellen (Terryn Westbrook) sends him to go live with his grandfather Charlie (Ed Begley Jr.), a retired private investigator in his dad’s hometown, Bixler Valley. During his stay, Xander finds a surprising lead in the case and teams up with a school newspaper reporter and classmate, Kenzie Messina (Ariel Martin).

With the help of Kenzie and his grandpa, Xander eventually finds his dad who was kidnapped by an old friend in order to raze the town.

Cast 
 Jace Norman as Xander Dewitt
 Ariel Martin as Kenzie Messina
 Samiyah Womack as Cara Jean
 Ed Begley Jr. as Charlie Dewitt
 Mike C. Nelson as Sheriff Mundy
 David Clayton Rogers as Jack Finn
 Terryn Westbrook as Ellen Dewitt
 Rick Peters as Russell Dewitt
 Matt Mitchell as young Russel Dewitt

Reception 
Bixler High Private Eye was positively reviewed by Kidsday reporters for Newsday.com, which gave it a "5 out of 5 smile rating."

References

External links 
 

2019 comedy films
2019 television films
2019 films
Films about cloning
Nickelodeon original films
Films about father–son relationships
Films about kidnapping
2010s English-language films